Lady Luck is a 1946 American comedy film starring Robert Young and Barbara Hale. The picture tells the story of a professional gambler who falls in love with a woman who hates gambling and tries to reform him.

Plot
Mary Audrey can't stand gambling. Her grandfather, William, whom she calls "Gramps," is a compulsive gambler. Mary puts him to work in her Beverly Hills book store to keep him away from his bad habit.

A professional gambler, Larry Scott, places a $200 wager with Gramps, who can't pay up when Larry's horse wins. Larry falls for Mary, however, woos and weds her, then takes her for a Las Vegas honeymoon without revealing his real profession.

Mary discovers the truth and angrily arranges a quick divorce. Sacramento Sam, gambler pal of Larry's, hatches a scheme with the casino's help. Mary will be permitted to win $500 gambling by the house, with Larry and Sam secretly covering the bet. Maybe she won't hate gambling so much this way.

It works, but too well. Mary begins genuinely winning and won't quit. Larry and Sam go broke covering her bets. Larry returns to Beverly Hills, where he finds Gramps running a bookie operation out of the book store. They go back to Vegas and have everything riding on one last game of poker, which Gramps loses deliberately so Larry can win the money and Mary's heart.

Cast
 Robert Young as Larry
 Barbara Hale as Mary
 Frank Morgan as Gramps
 James Gleason as Sacramento Sam
 Douglas Morrow as Morgan

Release

External links

Turner Classic Movies overview

1946 romantic comedy films
1946 films
Films directed by Edwin L. Marin
Films about gambling
RKO Pictures films
American romantic comedy films
Films scored by Leigh Harline
American black-and-white films
1940s English-language films
1940s American films